Jamel Zabi (born 19 June 1975) is a Tunisian former professional footballer who played as a forward. He played in five matches for the Tunisia national team in 2001 and 2002. He was also named in Tunisia's squad for the 2002 African Cup of Nations tournament.

References

External links
 

1975 births
Living people
Tunisian footballers
Association football forwards
Tunisia international footballers
2002 African Cup of Nations players
Place of birth missing (living people)